Volkameria mollis is a species of flowering plant in the family Lamiaceae that is native to the Galapagos Islands and to the mainland South American coast from Panama to Peru.

Description

Range

Habitat

Taxonomy

References

Flora of the Galápagos Islands
Lamiaceae